Communications in Cape Verde.

Telephones - main lines in use: 72 764 (2011)

Telephones - mobile cellular: 496 900 (2011)

Telephone system:general assessment: effective system, extensive modernization from 1996-2000 following partial privatization in 1995domestic: major service provider is Cabo Verde Telecom (CVT); fiber-optic ring, completed in 2001, links all islands providing Internet access and ISDN services; cellular service introduced in 1998; broadband services launched in 2004international: country code - 238; landing point for the Atlantis-2 fiber-optic transatlantic telephone cable that provides links to South America, Senegal, and Europe; HF radiotelephone to Senegal and Guinea-Bissau; satellite earth station - 1 Intelsat (Atlantic Ocean) (2007)

Radio broadcast stations: AM 0, FM 22 (and 12 repeaters), shortwave 0 (2002)

Television broadcast stations: 5 (and 7 repeaters) (2008)

Internet Service Providers (ISPs): 4 (2008)

Internet Users: 150 000 (2011)

Internet Hosts: 7 308 (2007)

Country code: CV

See also
Telephone numbers in Cape Verde
 Media of Cape Verde

External links
GSM World page on Cape Verde
PanAfriL10n page on Cape Verde
Operator receives third ISP licence in Cape Verde
Third of population owns cell phone, Internet has few subscribers

 
Cape Verde
Cape Verde